The Hușnicioara is a left tributary of the river Hușnița in Romania. It flows into the Hușnița near Selișteni.

References

Rivers of Romania
Rivers of Mehedinți County